= Sports kit =

Sports kit may refer to:

- sportswear
- sports equipment
